Greatest Hits Volume Three: Best of the Brother Years 1970–1986 is a compilation album of songs by American rock band The Beach Boys, released in 2000 by Capitol Records. It was released several months after its predecessors, The Greatest Hits – Volume 1: 20 Good Vibrations and The Greatest Hits – Volume 2: 20 More Good Vibrations.

Titled The Best of the Beach Boys: 1970–1986 in England, it included three additional songs not issued on the US version: "Tears in the Morning", the single edit of the disco remake of "Here Comes the Night", and "Sumahama", and dropped "Disney Girls". The albums failed to chart in either the US or UK.

Track listing

References

2000 greatest hits albums
The Beach Boys compilation albums
Capitol Records compilation albums